Roulette is a census-designated place located in Roulette Township in far western Potter County in the state of Pennsylvania, United States.  It is located along the Allegheny River, approximately 20 miles southwest of the river's source. The town is also on U.S. Route 6, roughly halfway between Port Allegany and Coudersport.  As of the 2010 census the population was 779 residents.

The community was named for Jean Roulette, a land agent.

References

Census-designated places in Potter County, Pennsylvania
Census-designated places in Pennsylvania